Dee Carstensen is a New York City-based alternative music singer-songwriter and harpist.

Career
Carstensen's singing and songwriting talents were discovered by vibist Mike Mainieri, with whom she is married. Her debut album Beloved One, released in 1993, included guitar work by Mark Knopfler of Dire Straits.

Her second album, Regarding the Soul (1995), integrated her singing, songwriting and harp-playing. The Map (1998) was a collaboration with Mainieri. Their first child, Ruby Anna, was born on November 19, 2000.

Dee also recorded a children's album, Can You Hear Lullaby (2001), which featured guest vocals Everett Bradley, Curtis King and Julie Dansky and instrumental work by her husband.

Dee went back into the studio and recorded a solo album, Patch of Blue, which was released in 2005. Unlike previous work, all eight songs were originals, except Fly Away whose music was co-written with her husband, who played vibraphone on the album. Patch of Blue did not include any guitar work. Instead, it featured Dee's harp and vocals, with backing from the Tosca String Quartet and several woodwind players.

Impact on harp music
Dee was the first pop singer to participate in the Lyon & Healy Jazz and Pop Harp Festival (1999), sharing the stage with jazz harpists Park Stickney and Deborah Henson-Conant. Dee plays a Lyon & Healy electric harp in her recordings and live performances. Her incorporation of harp in singer-songwriter and pop music also influenced the new generation of young singer-songwriter-harpists, such as Joanna Newsom and Habiba Doorenbos.

Discography
Beloved One (NYC Records, 1993)
Regarding The Soul (Exit Nine/Universal Music, 1995)
The Map (Exit Nine/Universal Music, 1998)
Home Away From Home (Live Album, Exit Nine/Universal Music, 1999)
Patch of Blue (Exit Nine/Universal Music, Released in November 2005)
 Other music: Sci-fi series  VR-5, Episode 6.  The music was created by composer John Frizzell. Dee Carstensen and Eileen Frizzell provided the vocals in the opening theme.  See VR-5 entry.

External links

References

American pop musicians
Living people
Musicians from New York (state)
American harpists
Year of birth missing (living people)